Mazia is a monotypic genus of butterflies in the family Nymphalidae that contains the species Mazia amazonica found in South America.

Subspecies
M. a. amazonica (Bates, 1864) (Brazil)
M. a. cocha Lamas, 1905 (Ecuador, Peru)
M. a. tambopata Lamas, 1995 (Peru)

References

External links
Butterflies of the Americas images

Melitaeini
Fauna of Brazil
Nymphalidae of South America
Monotypic butterfly genera
Taxa named by Robert P. Higgins